Andy Beckett (born 1969) is a British journalist and historian. He writes for The Guardian, the London Review of Books and The New York Times magazine.

He studied Modern History at Balliol College, Oxford, and journalism at the University of California, Berkeley.

Works
Pinochet in Piccadilly: Britain and Chile's Hidden History (London: Faber & Faber, 2002).
When the Lights Went Out: Britain in the Seventies (London: Faber & Faber, 2009).
Promised You A Miracle: Why 1980–82 Made Modern Britain (London: Allen Lane, 2015).

Notes

1969 births
Living people
British journalists
British historians